Osnago is a town and comune in the province of Lecco, in Lombardy, Italy. It is served by Osnago railway station.

References

Cities and towns in Lombardy